Laura Beatrice White (born 27 May 1996) is a British actress. Following stage roles including starring as Sandra Wilkinson in a UK tour of The Play That Goes Wrong, White appeared in the BBC soap opera Doctors as Princess Buchanan from 2022 to 2023. For her role as Princess, White was nominated for the British Soap Award for Villain of the Year.

Life and career
White was born on 27 May 1996 in Yorkshire, England, to parents of British and Jamaican heritage. At a young age, White, alongside her parents and two siblings, relocated to Wales. White studied musical theatre at the Guildford School of Acting, which she graduated from in 2017. She then appeared in various short films and advertisements, including a television advertisement for Naked Juice. After graduating, she set up the Page One Project, a programme that offers support, advice and guidance to people from underrepresented backgrounds in the arts industry. Alongside acting, she is also a trained life coach, having gained a coaching qualification from the Animas Centre for Coaches, as well as Mental Health First Aid training and Mindfulness teaching. In March 2020, White lost her job and was forced to move back in with her parents; she said that during that time, she felt "completely lost" with no knowledge of what to do with her career.

In 2020, during the COVID-19 pandemic, White starred in the socially distanced immersive production C-o-n-t-a-c-t in London. She received critical acclaim for her portrayal of Sarah, with the British Theatre Guide describing her as "sweet and engaging" and Adam Tipping of Pocket Sized Theatre writing that White "carried the production with ease, synchronisation, and relatability". Later in 2020, White was announced as a cast member for a production of The Play That Goes Wrong. She toured with the production from 2020 to 2021. In 2021, White featured in the drama film The Colour Room. She was proud to appear in the film as she felt it was a career highlight to tell the story of artist Clarice Cliff. Also in 2021, she appeared in Big Age, a Channel 4 sitcom pilot written by Bolu Babalola. In 2022, White made a guest appearance in an episode of the BBC comedy series Lazy Susan. Also that year, she made her first appearance as Princess Buchanan, a trainee doctor, on the BBC soap opera Doctors. For her portrayal of the role, White was nominated for the British Soap Award for Villain of the Year at the 2022 ceremony. She made her final appearance as Princess in January 2023. Following her exit, White took to Instagram to thank the soap for a "amazing, whirlwind 10 months", as well as thanking the cast and crew for being hardworking while also "creating such a warm, welcoming working space".

Filmography

Stage

Awards and nominations

References

External links
 

1996 births
21st-century British actresses
Actresses from Yorkshire
Alumni of the Guildford School of Acting
Black British actresses
British film actresses
British soap opera actresses
British stage actresses
British television actresses
Living people